Lechon (or LeChon) is a South American restaurant in Portland, Oregon's Old Town Chinatown neighborhood, in the United States. Jaco Smith opened the restaurant, which serves Argentine and Chilean cuisine, in August 2015.

Description
Lechon is housed in the Smith's Block building, built in 1872, along Southwest Naito Parkway. Michael Russell of The Oregonian described the menu as "global, with identifiably South American dishes -- fried empanadas, crab-stuffed piquillo peppers and an Argentine asado with grilled meats and sweetbreads -- alongside more Northwest-y bistro fare -- foie gras torchon with cherry mostarda, forest mushrooms and a farm egg on toasted brioche".

History
In 2018, the restaurant was featured in the "Flavor Fiesta!" episode of the sixteenth season of the Travel Channel's series Food Paradise.

Reception 
The business was included in Eater Portland's 2022 overview of "Where to Eat and Drink in Downtown Portland".

See also
 Hispanics and Latinos in Portland, Oregon

References

External links

 
 

2015 establishments in Oregon
Argentine American
Argentine restaurants
Chilean American
Chilean restaurants
Latin American restaurants in Portland, Oregon
Old Town Chinatown
Restaurants established in 2015
Restaurants in Portland, Oregon
Southwest Portland, Oregon